This is a list of radio stations in Ukraine.

Public stations in Ukraine

Suspilne Ukraine
 "Ukrainian radio"  (with regional time blocks in Monday-Friday 12:35-13:00 and 17:35-18:00 (Kyiv time)) (DAB+ in foreign countries: Mainz (Germany), Madrid and Barcelona (Spain), Czech Republic (also in DVB-T2) and Poland (23:00-9:00 Warsaw time))
 "Radio Kultura"
 "Radio Promin"
 ″Radio Tysa FM″ (103.0 FM in Uzhgorod (timeshare with "Radio Promin") and satellite radio station)
 Radio Ukraine International (1386 AM in Lithuania (21:00-3:30 UTC) and satellite radio station)

Non-commercial radio stations in Ukraine
 Radio Emmanuil 
 Radio Maria Ukraine 
 Radio "Voice of Hope" Ukraine 
 Radio M 
 Hromadske Radio
 Army FM

Commercial radio stations in Ukraine

TAVR Media
 Radio Bayraktar 
 Hit FM 
 Nashe Radio 
 Radio Roks 
 Kiss FM 
 Melodiya FM 
 Radio Relax 
 Radio Jazz (Kyiv 104.6 FM, Lviv 105.4 FM, Dinpro 89.3 FM, Zaporizhzhia 89.9 FM) 
 Radio Classic (Kyiv 92.4 FM, planned Zaporizhzhia 99.3 FM)

Business Radio Group
 Radio Shanson 
 DJ FM 
 POWER FM 
 Business Radio (Kyiv 93.8 FM (currently off-air in FM), Kharkiv 106.6 FM) 

JSC Lux
 Lux FM 
 Maximum FM 
 Nostalgie FM (Kyiv 99.0 FM, planned Lviv 97.0 FM) 

Mediaholding Rozvitok
 Radio P'yatnytsya 
 Avtoradio 

1st Ukrainian Radio Group
 Perec FM 
 Best FM (Kyiv 95.6 FM) 
 MFM (Kharkiv 91.2 FM) 

UMH
 NRJ 
 Lounge FM (Kyiv 106.0 FM, currently off-air in FM) 

RadioCorp
 Kraina FM

Dragon Capital
 Radio NV 

Free Media Holding
 Pryamiy FM (Kyiv 88.4 FM)

Group company "Prosto"
 Prosto Radi.O (Kyiv 102.5 FM and Zhytomyr 104.9 FM. Currently off-air in Odesa 105.3 FM, Izmail 101.2 FM, Mykolaiv 104.6 FM and Dnipro 105.8 FM) 
 Radio Miami (Kyiv 100.5 FM. Currently off-air in Odesa 107.0 FM, Izmail 107.1 FM, Petrovirivka 105.8 FM and Vesternichani 106.2 FM)
 Europa Plus Odesa (Odesa 89.7 FM, currently off-air)
 Narodnoe radio (Odesa 103.2 FM, currently off-air) 

and other regional and local stations in Ukraine

International radio stations
 Radio Svoboda – satellite and internet station (Radio Crimea. Reality, currently most retranslation from "Current Time TV"), production radio programmes for partnership radio stations
 Polish radio Ukrainian service – 1386 AM every morning, satellite, Internet, special channel "Polish Radio for Ukraine" (9:00-23:00 Warsaw time, timeshare with "Ukrainian radio", DAB+ in Poland), also retranslation in Radio Poland DAB+ and Hromadkse Radio 
 Radio Romania International Ukrainian Service – shortwave, satellite and Internet station
 Vatican Radio Ukrainian Service – shortwave, satellite and Internet station, also retranslation in Radio Maria Ukraine
 Trans World Radio Ukraine – 1035 AM, 621 AM, 1377 AM and Internet station

See also
List of radio stations in Kyiv

References

Ukrainian
Ukraine

Radio in Ukraine